Ticknall Cricket Club is an amateur cricket club based in Ticknall, Derbyshire, England. The origin of the club is unknown, but it is locally believed that Ticknall's relationship with cricket began in the mid-19th century.

Ground
Ticknall's main ground is the Grange, a picturesque ground on Repton Road in Ticknall, which includes a two-lane all-weather net facility. Their second ground is at the old Woodville Cricket ground, on Burton Road, Derbyshire. The 1st and 2nd XI teams use the Grange, rated by the DCCL as a Grade A+ ground, and the 3rd XI use the Woodville ground, rated as a Grade C ground by the DCCL.

History
It is not known when the club was established, but local knowledge believe it to be around 1850. The earliest known cricket ground used by Ticknell was in the field adjacent to the current ground on Repton Road. One of the earliest records show Ticknall winning the Burton and District Cricket League in 1910. The club moved to their current ground, the Grange, in 1921. After a break during the Second World War, the club resumed activity playing friendly matches, until catastrophe hit the club when their wooden pavilion was destroyed by fire at the beginning of the cricket season in 1968. The club had no option but to use the garage next to the church as a changing room, and host teas in the local pub. The club entered the Derby and District Cricket League in 1971 and by the early 1980s, Ticknall fielded their first junior team, establishing the birth of a successful junior section that thrives today. It was during this time that the club was then able to field a second XI team, enabling the club to join the Central Derbyshire League in 1984, winning the league championship in 1987. In 1992, the club joined the Derbyshire County Cricket League, where it still plays today. The ground, overlooked by the village church, and graced with a new pavilion, built in 2000, is considered by many as one of the prettiest grounds in Derbyshire.

The Club currently has three senior teams competing in the Derbyshire County Cricket League, a Friendly XI team, and a long established and very successful junior training section that play competitive cricket in the South Derbyshire Development Group.

Club Performance
The Derbyshire County Cricket League competition results showing the club's positions in the league (by Division) since 1999.

Club Honours

Ticknall CC on film
 Derbyshire Cricket Foundation: Aidan Melen and John Dumelow talk about their involvement with Ticknall Cricket Club.
 Derbyshire Cricket Foundation: Paul Borrington and Andrew Butler discuss their cricketing memories.
 Ockbrook & Borrowash 1xi v Ticknall 1xi - DCCL Premier Division - 17.06.2017
 Joss Morgan hits 150 in the Derbyshire Cup Final for Ticknall Cricket Club

Notable players
Paul Borrington
Wayne Madsen
Tony Palladino
Tom Taylor
Mark Turner
Thomas Wood

See also
Club cricket

References

External links
 The Club Play-Cricket website

English club cricket teams
Cricket in Derbyshire
Club cricket